The 1960–61 Copa México was the 44th edition of the Copa México and the 18th staging in the professional era.

The competition started on March 18, 1961, and concluded on April 30, 1961, with the Final, held at the Estadio Olímpico Universitario in Mexico City, in which Tampico Madero defeated Toluca 1–0 to win the first cup title for the club.

First round

|}

Quarterfinals

|}

Bye: León

Semifinals

|}

Final

References

Copa MX
1960–61 in Mexican football
1960–61 domestic association football cups